The 2019–20 Liga MX season 
(known as the Liga BBVA MX for sponsorship reasons) was the 73rd professional season of the top-flight football league in Mexico. The season was divided into two championships—the Torneo Apertura and the Torneo Clausura—each in an identical format and each contested by the same nineteen teams. The Apertura tournament began on 19 July 2019.

On 15 March 2020, the Mexican Football Federation suspended the Clausura seasons of Liga MX, Ascenso MX and Liga MX Femenil indefinitely due to the coronavirus pandemic.

On 22 May 2020, the season was cancelled due to the COVID-19 pandemic affecting the country.  While no official champion was crowned for that season officially, Cruz Azul and León were awarded the Clausura champions and runners-up positions ("MEX2" and "MEX4") respectively for purposes of filling the 2021 CONCACAF Champions League, as the first and second-placed teams of the regular season at the time of suspension.

Teams, stadiums, and personnel 
The following nineteen teams competed this season. Atlético San Luis was promoted from the Ascenso MX. Veracruz was to be relegated to the Ascenso MX initially after accumulating the lowest point coefficient last season, but instead they offered to pay MXN$120 million to remain in Liga MX. The team, however, was eventually disaffiliated by the FMF at the end of the Apertura 2019 tournament. Lobos BUAP's franchise in the first division was purchased by FC Juárez. Lobos BUAP will be able to participate in the Ascenso MX but will remain frozen for one year.

Stadiums and locations

Personnel and kits

Managerial changes

Torneo Apertura
The Apertura 2019 season began on 19 July 2019 and ended on 15 December 2019. The defending champions were Tigres UANL, having won their seventh title.

Regular season

Standings

Positions by round

Results
Teams played every other team once (either at home or away), with one team resting each round, completing a total of 19 rounds.

Regular season statistics

Top goalscorers 
Players sorted first by goals scored, then by last name.

Source: Liga MX

Top assists 
Players sorted first by assists, then by last name.

Source: Soccerway

Hat tricks

Attendance

Per team

|h=63908|l=0|a=|pr=22680|u=|source=Liga MX|notes=Only regular season listed1: Team played in Ascenso MX last season.|date=June 2019}}

Highest and lowest

Source: Liga MX

Liguilla – Apertura

Bracket 

 Teams were re-seeded each round.
 Team with more goals on aggregate after two matches advanced.
 Away goals rule was applied in the quarter-finals and semi-finals, but not the final.
 In the quarter-finals and semi-finals, if the two teams were tied on aggregate and away goals, the higher seeded team advanced.
 In the final, if the two teams were tied after both legs, the match went to extra time and, if necessary, a shoot-out.
 Both finalists qualified to the 2021 CONCACAF Champions League (champions as MEX1, runners-up as MEX3).

Quarter-finals

Semi-finals

Finals

Torneo Clausura
The Clausura 2020 season began on 10 January 2020.

On 15 March 2020, the Mexican Football Federation suspended the Liga MX, Ascenso MX and Liga MX Femenil indefinitely due to the coronavirus pandemic. On 22 May 2020, the Clausura 2020 was officially cancelled due to the COVID-19 pandemic affecting the country and no champion was crowned. The two 2021 CONCACAF Champions League berths were given to the top two teams in the regular season at the time of suspension (1st place as MEX2, 2nd place as MEX4).

Regular season

Standings

Positions by Round

Results
Teams were originally planned to play every other team once (either at home or away), completing a total of 17 rounds. Only 10 rounds were able to be completed before the league was suspended.

Regular season statistics

Top goalscorers 
Players sorted first by goals scored, then by last name.

Source: Liga MX

Assists 
Players sorted first by assists, then by last name.

Source: Soccerway

Hat tricks

Attendance

Per team

|h=45516|l=0|a=|pr=22773|source=Liga MX|notes=Only regular season listed|date=May 2020}}

Highest and lowest

Source: Liga MX

Relegation table

Last update: 15 March 2020
 Rules for relegation: 1) Relegation coefficient; 2) Goal difference; 3) Number of goals scored; 4) Head-to-head results between tied teams; 5) Number of goals scored away; 6) Fair Play points
 D = Disaffiliated .
Source: Liga MX

Aggregate table 
The aggregate table (the sum of points of both the Apertura and Clausura tournaments) would have been used to determine the participants of the 2020 Leagues Cup had that tournament not been cancelled due to the COVID-19 pandemic.

Notes

See also 
2019–20 Ascenso MX season
2019–20 Liga MX Femenil season

References

External links
 Official website of Liga MX

 
Liga MX seasons
Mx
1
Liga MX